Ancylobacter dichloromethanicus is an aerobic, Gram-negative bacteria from the family of Xanthobacteraceae which has been isolated from dichloromethane contaminated soil in Volgograd in Russia. Ancylobacter dichloromethanicus can use dichloromethane, methanol, formate and formaldehyde for its metabolism.

References

Further reading

External links
Type strain of Ancylobacter dichloromethanicus at BacDive -  the Bacterial Diversity Metadatabase

Hyphomicrobiales
Bacteria described in 2010